Talia Hannah Schlanger is a Canadian radio broadcaster, who has worked in both Canada and the United States. Formerly a weekend host of Radio 2 Morning on CBC Radio 2 and TV host of CBC Music Backstage Pass, and a part-time host on CBC Radio 3, her selection as host of NPR's music program World Cafe was announced in February 2017. She joined World Cafe in October 2016 as a contributing producer, and was named the program's new host after the retirement of David Dye. In June 2019, she announced her departure from the program to return to other creative projects. In September 2019, Raina Douris was announced as her successor.

Schlanger grew up in a Jewish family in Thornhill, Ontario. She is a graduate of Ryerson University's program in radio and television arts. Prior to joining the Canadian Broadcasting Corporation, Schlanger was an actress, whose credits included the supporting role of Madison in Strange Days at Blake Holsey High, guest roles in System Crash and Degrassi: The Next Generation, and musical theatre roles in Mirvish Productions' Mamma Mia, the original Canadian company of Queen's We Will Rock You and the first national U.S. tour of Green Day's American Idiot.

She won a Canadian Screen Award in 2014 as a coproducer with Brent Hodge, Bryan Ward, Grant Lawrence and Kai Black of The Beetle Roadtrip Sessions, a web series on CBC Music in which Lawrence travelled across Canada meeting local musicians and other personalities.

Since leaving World Cafe, Schlanger has again been heard as a fill-in host on CBC Radio programming as well as guest host on 'Here's The Thing with Alec Baldwin'.

References

External links

CBC Radio hosts
Canadian television actresses
Canadian musical theatre actresses
Canadian radio producers
Jewish Canadian actresses
Living people
Canadian child actresses
Toronto Metropolitan University alumni
People from Thornhill, Ontario
Year of birth missing (living people)
Canadian women radio hosts
Jewish Canadian musicians
Women radio producers